Plasmodium iguanae is a parasite of the genus Plasmodium.

Like all Plasmodium species P. iguanae has both vertebrate and insect hosts. The vertebrate hosts for this parasite are reptiles.

Description 
The parasite was first described by Telford in 1980.

Geographical occurrence 
This species is found in Venezuela.

Clinical features and host pathology 
The only known host species is the Green Iguana lizard Iguana iguana.

References 

iguanae